In enzymology, a protein-disulfide reductase is an enzyme that catalyzes the chemical reaction

protein dithiol + NAD(P)+  protein disulfide + NAD(P)H + H+

The 3 substrates of this enzyme are protein dithiol, NAD+, and NADP+, whereas its 4 products are protein disulfide, NADH, NADPH, and H+.

This enzyme belongs to the family of oxidoreductases, specifically those acting on a sulfur group of donors with NAD+ or NADP+ as acceptor.  The systematic name of this enzyme class is protein-dithiol:NAD(P)+ oxidoreductase. Other names in common use include protein disulphide reductase, insulin-glutathione transhydrogenase, disulfide reductase, and NAD(P)H2:protein-disulfide oxidoreductase.

Structural studies

References

 

EC 1.8.1
NADPH-dependent enzymes
NADH-dependent enzymes
Enzymes of known structure